Atwater is an unincorporated community in Shaws Point Township, Macoupin County, Illinois, United States. Atwater had a post office, which closed on October 12, 2002.

References

Unincorporated communities in Macoupin County, Illinois
Unincorporated communities in Illinois